Ivan Noel Clues (born 10 May 1929) is a former Australian rules footballer who played with Collingwood in the Victorian Football League (VFL).

Notes

External links 

Ivan Clues's playing statistics from The VFA Project

Living people
1929 births
Australian rules footballers from Victoria (Australia)
Collingwood Football Club players
Brunswick Football Club players